Lawrence Peter Peterson (April 12, 1873 – September 7, 1951) was a provincial politician from Alberta, Canada. He served as a member of the Legislative Assembly of Alberta from 1921 to 1930 sitting with the United Farmers caucus in government.

Political career
Peterson ran for a seat to the Alberta Legislature for the first time in the 1921 Alberta general election. He stood as a United Farmers candidate in the electoral district of Taber and won a close race over incumbent Archibald McLean to pick up the seat for his party.

Peterson ran for a second term in office in the 1926 Alberta general election. He lost some of his popular vote from the last election but defeated two other candidates with a large majority.

Peterson did not run for a third term in office and retired at dissolution of the assembly in 1930.

References

External links
Legislative Assembly of Alberta Members Listing

United Farmers of Alberta MLAs
1951 deaths
1873 births
American emigrants to Canada